Ad van den Berg may refer to

Adrian Vandenberg, Dutch guitarist for Vandenberg and Whitesnake
Ad van den Berg, Dutch politician for the Party for Neighbourly Love, Freedom, and Diversity and chairman of Vereniging Martijn